Greenwich London Borough Council is the local authority for the Royal Borough of Greenwich in London, England. The council is elected every four years. Since the last boundary changes in 2022, 55 councillors have been elected from 23 wards.

Political control
The first elections to the council were held in 1964, ahead of the new system coming into full effect in 1965. Political control of the council since 1964 has been held by the following parties:

Leadership
The leaders of the council since 1965 have been:

Council elections
 1964 Greenwich London Borough Council election
 1968 Greenwich London Borough Council election
 1971 Greenwich London Borough Council election
 1974 Greenwich London Borough Council election
 1978 Greenwich London Borough Council election (boundary changes increased the number of seats by two)
 1982 Greenwich London Borough Council election
 1986 Greenwich London Borough Council election
 1990 Greenwich London Borough Council election
 1994 Greenwich London Borough Council election (boundary changes took place but the number of seats remained the same)
 1998 Greenwich London Borough Council election
 2002 Greenwich London Borough Council election (boundary changes reduced the number of seats by eleven) 
 2006 Greenwich London Borough Council election
 2010 Greenwich London Borough Council election
 2014 Greenwich London Borough Council election
 2018 Greenwich London Borough Council election
 2022 Greenwich London Borough Council election (boundary changes increased the number of seats by four)

Borough result maps

By-election results

1964-1968
There were no by-elections.

1968-1971

1971-1974

1974-1978

1978-1982

Resignation of James S. Foreman-Peck (CON)

Resignation of Joseph Stanyer (LAB)

Resignation of John Dunbar (LAB)

Resignation of Anthony J. Newman (LAB)

Resignation of William H. White (LAB)

1982-1986

Resignation of Francis E. Smith (LAB)

Resignation of David Crowther (LAB)

Resignation of Raymond G. Hatter (CON)

1986-1990

Resignation of Smith, Nicholas (LAB)

Resignation of Jeffrey, Mervyn A. (LAB)

Resignation of Morgan, Steven J. (LAB)

1990-1994

The by-election was called following the resignation of Cllr. Giles J. Brennand.

The by-election was called following the disqualification of Cllr. Kenneth L. Kear.

The by-election was called following the resignation of Cllr. Roger J. Taylor.

1994-1998

The by-election was called following the resignation of Cllr. Adele Gordon-Peiniger.

The by-election was called following the resignation of Cllr. Annette F. Barratt.

The by-election was called following the resignation of Cllr. Sabiha Shahzad.

The by-election was called following the death of Cllr. Claude D. Ramsey.

1998-2002

 
The by-election was called following the death of Cllr. Sidney T. Nicholson.

The by-election was called following the death of Cllr. Marian O. Moseley.

 
The by-election was called following the resignation of Cllr. Leonard L. Duvall.

2002-2006

The by-election was called following the death of Cllr. Alistair T. Macrae.

The by-election was called following the resignation of Cllr. Michael A. Hayes.

The by-election was called following the resignation of Cllr. Douglas B. Ellison.

2006-2010

The by-election was called following the death of Cllr. Kantabai M. Patel.

2010-2014
There were no by-elections.

2014-2018

The by-election was called following the resignation of Cllr Matthew Pennycook, who was elected as the Member of Parliament for the Greenwich and Woolwich constituency the same night.

The by-election was called following the resignation of Councillor Radha Rabadia of the Labour Party.

The by-election was called following the resignation of Councillor Wynn Davies of the Labour Party.

References

External links
 Greenwich Council